Henri Koide (born 6 April 2001) is a Swiss professional footballer who plays as a forward for Belgian club Beerschot.

Club career
Koide signed his first professional contract with FC Zurich in 2020. Koide was loaned to Swiss Challenge League club FC Wil for the second half of the 2020-21 season in January 2021. On 21 January 2022, Koide joined Neuchâtel Xamax on loan until the end of the season. On 8 July 2022, FC Zurich announced that they had extended Koide's contract through summer 2024. Koide's loan with Neuchâtel Xamax was extended until June 2023. 

On 31 January 2023, Koide signed a two-and-a-half-year contract with Beerschot in Belgium.

Personal life
Born in Switzerland, Koide is of Ivorian descent.

Career statistics

Club

Notes

References

2001 births
Footballers from Zürich
Swiss people of Ivorian descent
Living people
Swiss men's footballers
Switzerland youth international footballers
Association football forwards
FC Zürich players
FC Wil players
Neuchâtel Xamax FCS players
K Beerschot VA players
Swiss Super League players
Swiss Challenge League players
Swiss Promotion League players
Swiss 1. Liga (football) players
Challenger Pro League players
Swiss expatriate footballers
Expatriate footballers in Belgium
Swiss expatriate sportspeople in Belgium